Corrado Grabbi (born 29 July 1975) is an Italian former professional footballer who played as a forward. He was nicknamed "Ciccio" throughout his career.

He is currently under contract with Juventus as a Under-15 youth coach.

Playing career

Early career
Born in Turin, Grabbi began his career with the Juventus youth team. He is also the grandson of former Juventus player Giuseppe Grabbi. He was later promoted to the first team and scored on his debut against Lazio, in one of his total two appearances in the 1994–95 season. Unable to break into the team, because of his young age and
the contemporary explosion of Alessandro Del Piero, he was loaned to Lucchese (76 games, 8 goals) and then Chievo (18 games, 2 goals) before switching to Modena. There he found some real form, scoring 30 times in 58 appearances. This performance saw him signed by Ternana, where he played for one season before been loaned to Ravenna where he scored 13 goals. When he returned to Ternana he became a regular scorer again, with 20 goals in 34 games and became idol for the local supporters, who still remember him as the best player to ever have played for Ternana.

Blackburn Rovers
Grabbi's prolific season with Ternana saw him attract attention of various Serie A clubs, including Udinese and AC Milan. But apparently Luciano Moggi of Juventus, who had previously pressured Grabbi to change his agent and join GEA World with no success, made it impossible for Ciccio to play in Italy, so in 2001 he was signed by Blackburn Rovers for a record fee of £6.75 million in July 2001, but due to injuries and personal reasons, he failed to repeat this progress, scoring just once in fourteen league games, his goal coming in a 1–0 win over Everton. He scored once more before going on loan to Messina, in the FA Cup against Barnsley. Leaving the club on loan meant he missed out on their victory in the 2002 League Cup Final. Grabbi's move to Blackburn is widely regarded as one of the worst transfers in the history of the Premier League.

In the same interview, Grabbi stated that the only person who he became friends with in this time was Tugay Kerimoğlu.

Despite his unsuccessful spell at Blackburn Rovers, Grabbi still has a cult following with fans of the club.

During a loan spell back in Italy with Messina, he scored two goals in the final game of the season and saved Messina from relegation. Upon his return to England, he failed to reignite his form, and after a further 16 games and three goals (against Liverpool in the league, CSKA Sofia in the UEFA Cup and Walsall in the League Cup) with Blackburn, who had in the meantime signed ex-Manchester United strikers Dwight Yorke and Andy Cole, he was allowed to return to Italy permanently with Ancona in 2004.

Later career
After spending one year without a team, trying to recover from the injury caused by a rare form of foot disease (Leveraus Morb) which had afflicted him for the past three seasons, he joined Genoa of Serie C1/A in September 2005. With his new team, he gained promotion to Serie B on playoffs scoring 9 goals in 25 games.

Club president Enrico Preziosi decided then that Genoa did not need Grabbi anymore, so during the 2007 winter transfer window, Grabbi signed for Arezzo, still in Serie B, after having never made a single appearance in the first half of the season for Genoa. After relegation with Arezzo, scoring no goals, Grabbi signed a contract with AC Bellinzona, a team from the Swiss Challenge League (second division). Ciccio scored the winning goal (his first after more than one year) in the Swiss Cup game Bellinzona-Gossau: 2–1 .

Grabbi was also directly involved in the Calciopoli scandal of summer 2006 as a victim: It was in fact only then that Ciccio could tell the media what Luciano Moggi had done to affect his career: after Ciccio Grabbi had refused to drop his agent in favour of Luciano  Moggi's son, Moggi told him "you will never play football again, if not in my garden!" Grabbi was propriety of Juventus until he was sold to Ternana.

Coaching career
After retirement, Grabbi took on a coaching career, joining his former playing team Juventus as a youth coach in 2009. Among all the players he trained as a youth coach from his early years in the Pulcini category, Grabbi also worked with Italian international Moise Kean.

Honours

Club
Juventus
Serie A: 1994–95
Coppa Italia: 1994–95

Blackburn Rovers
League Cup: 2001–02

References

Websites
http://www.acbellinzona.ch
http://corradograbbi.blogspot.com/

1975 births
Living people
Footballers from Turin
Association football forwards
Italian footballers
Juventus F.C. players
S.S.D. Lucchese 1905 players
A.C. ChievoVerona players
Modena F.C. players
Ternana Calcio players
Ravenna F.C. players
Blackburn Rovers F.C. players
A.C.R. Messina players
A.C. Ancona players
Genoa C.F.C. players
S.S. Arezzo players
AC Bellinzona players
Premier League players
Serie A players
Serie B players
Expatriate footballers in England
Expatriate footballers in Switzerland
Italian expatriate sportspeople in Switzerland
Italian expatriate sportspeople in England
Italian expatriate footballers
Italian football managers